Mark James Julian Faber (15 August 1950 – 10 December 1991) was an English cricketer who played for Oxford University and Sussex from 1970 to 1976.

Faber attended Summer Fields School. He appeared in 78 first-class matches as a right-handed batsman. He scored 3,009 runs with a highest score of 176 among three centuries.

In 1976, Faber requested a release from his contract to join his family's insurance business.

Faber died in 1991 from complications following a leg operation (from an old cricket injury during the early 1980s).

References

External links
 Mark Faber at CricketArchive
 Mark Faber at Cricinfo

1950 births
1991 deaths
English cricketers
People educated at Eton College
Alumni of Balliol College, Oxford
Oxford University cricketers
Sussex cricketers
People from Horsted Keynes
People educated at Summer Fields School